Thalassoma loxum is a species of wrasse endemic to the Arabian Sea, where it is only known from the waters of Oman. This species can reach  in total length.

References

luxom
Fish described in 1994